The Western Canon: The Books and School of the Ages is a 1994 book about Western literature by the American literary critic Harold Bloom, in which the author defends the concept of the Western canon by discussing 26 writers whom he sees as central to the canon.

Summary
Bloom argues against what he calls the "school of resentment", which includes feminist literary criticism, Marxist literary criticism, Lacanians, New Historicism, Deconstructionists, and semioticians. The Western Canon includes four appendices listing works that Bloom at the time considered canonical, stretching from the earliest scriptures to Tony Kushner's Angels in America. Bloom later disowned the list, saying that it was written at his editor's insistence and distracted from the book's intention.

Bloom defends the concept of the Western canon by discussing 26 writers whom he sees as central to the canon:

 William Shakespeare
 Dante Alighieri
 Geoffrey Chaucer
 Miguel de Cervantes
 Michel de Montaigne
 Molière
 John Milton
 Samuel Johnson
 Johann Wolfgang von Goethe
 William Wordsworth
 Jane Austen
 Walt Whitman
 Emily Dickinson
 Charles Dickens
 George Eliot
 Leo Tolstoy
 Henrik Ibsen
 Sigmund Freud
 Marcel Proust
 James Joyce
 Virginia Woolf
 Franz Kafka
 Jorge Luis Borges
 Pablo Neruda
 Fernando Pessoa
 Samuel Beckett

Reception
Norman Fruman of The New York Times wrote that "The Western Canon is a heroically brave, formidably learned and often unbearably sad response to the present state of the humanities."

The novelist A. S. Byatt wrote: 
Piotr Wilczek and  criticized Bloom's for narrow interpretation of the concept of the West, ignoring works from with which countries he was not familiar, such as Poland, which are significantly underrepresented in his scheme. They interpret his list as dominated by British and American culture, with a small dose of ancient Western classics and a few non-English works from other Western European countries. At the same time, they concur that such a group is pretty standard for the Western canon as understood by most Western European scholars.

School of resentment

"School of resentment" is a pejorative term coined by Bloom and expounded upon in his work.  It is used to describe related schools of literary criticism that have gained prominence in academia since the 1970s and which Bloom contended are preoccupied with political and social activism at the expense of aesthetic values.  Broadly, what Bloom termed "schools of resentment" approaches associate with Marxist critical theory, including African-American studies, Marxist literary criticism, New Historicist criticism, feminist criticism and post-structuralism—specifically as promoted by Jacques Lacan, Jacques Derrida and Michel Foucault.  The "school of resentment" is usually defined as comprising all scholars who wish to enlarge the Western Canon by adding to it more works by authors from minority groups without regard to aesthetic merit and/or influence over time, or those who argue that some works commonly thought canonical promote sexist, racist or otherwise biased values and should therefore be removed from the canon. Bloom contended that the school of resentment threatens the nature of the canon itself and may lead to its eventual demise.

Philosopher Richard Rorty agreed that Bloom is at least partly accurate in his description of the "school of resentment", writing that those identified by Bloom do in fact routinely use "subversive, oppositional discourse" to attack the canon specifically and Western culture in general. Yet "this school deserves to be taken seriously—more seriously than Bloom's trivialization of it as mere resentment."

See also
 Ressentiment

References

External links
 Harold Bloom's canonical list

1994 non-fiction books
Books about books
Books by Harold Bloom
English-language books
Harcourt (publisher) books
Lists of books